Antoni Brzeżańczyk (19 January 1919 – 26 May 1987) was a Polish footballer and football manager.

He played for Podgórze Kraków, Dąb Poznań, Lechia Gdańsk, Odra Opole, AKS Chorzów, Lech Poznań and Stal Mielec where he began his coaching career.

He coached Stal Mielec, Polonia Bydgoszcz, Zawisza Bydgoszcz, Warta Poznań, GKS Katowice, Olimpia Poznań, Odra Opole, Zagłębie Wałbrzych, Zagłębie Sosnowiec, Górnik Zabrze, Feyenoord, Rapid Wien, Admira Wien, Iraklis and Wiener Sportclub.

He died in Vienna in 1987.

References

1919 births
1987 deaths
People from Ternopil Oblast
People from Berezhany
Polish footballers
Association football forwards
Association football midfielders
Lechia Gdańsk players
Lech Poznań players
Odra Opole players
Stal Mielec players
Polish football managers
Eredivisie managers
Polonia Bytom managers
GKS Katowice managers
Zawisza Bydgoszcz managers
Górnik Zabrze managers
Odra Opole managers
Zagłębie Sosnowiec managers
Feyenoord managers
SK Rapid Wien managers
Wiener Sport-Club managers
Iraklis Thessaloniki F.C. managers
Polish expatriate football managers
Polish expatriate sportspeople in Austria
Expatriate football managers in Austria
Polish expatriate sportspeople in Greece
Expatriate football managers in Greece
Polish expatriate sportspeople in the Netherlands
Expatriate football managers in the Netherlands